Damir Latović (born July 10, 1980) is a retired Serbian professional basketball player.

References

External links
  
 
 
 Damir Latovic Stats, News, Bio
 Damir Latovic Player Profile, Irakleio OAA, News, Stats - Eurobasket
 Livescores - Soccer - Scoresway
 Damir Latovic College Stats

1980 births
Living people
Basketball players from Belgrade
Ethnikos Piraeus B.C. players
Irakleio B.C. players
Kolossos Rodou B.C. players
Montana State Bobcats men's basketball players
Pagrati B.C. players
Pasadena City Lancers men's basketball players
Pensacola State Pirates men's basketball players
Power forwards (basketball)
Psychiko B.C. players
Rethymno B.C. players
Serbian men's basketball players
Serbian expatriate basketball people in Greece
Serbian expatriate basketball people in Slovenia
Serbian expatriate basketball people in North Macedonia
Serbian expatriate basketball people in the United States